The Fama–DFA Prize is an annual prize given to authors with the best capital markets and asset pricing research papers published in the Journal of Financial Economics.  The award is named after Eugene Fama, who is a co-founding advisory editor of the journal, a financial economist who helped to develop the efficient-market hypothesis and random walk hypothesis in asset pricing, a 2013 Nobel laureate in Economics, a professor of finance at the Booth School of Business at the University of Chicago, and a research director for Dimensional Fund Advisors and the Center for Research in Securities Prices. The prize is also named for the investment advisory firm, Dimensional Fund Advisors.

Details
Each year personal and student subscribers to the Journal of Financial Economics vote for the best paper in each of two categories after the journal's editorial office has enumerated all articles and assigned them to either the corporate finance and organizations area or the capital markets and asset pricing areas.  Each subscriber may use one vote for each category.  Currently the first prize in each category is $5,000 and the second prize is $2,500.

Winners
The following table is a complete list of past first and second-place winners of the Fama–DFA Prize:

See also

 List of economics awards

Notes

Economics journals
Economics awards